Amaimon is a Papuan language spoken by 1,781 people in Madang Province, Papua New Guinea. It is spoken in Amaimon, Transgogol Rural LLG.

Writing system

References

Amaimon–Numagen languages
Languages of Madang Province